Deborah Sugg Ryan is a British design historian, Professor of Design History and Theory and Associate Dean (Research) at the University of Portsmouth.

Sugg Ryan was previously Associate Professor of History and Theory of Design at Falmouth University.

She was series consultant and on-screen expert for the BBC2 television series A House Through Time.

Selected publications

Books
The Ideal Home Through the Twentieth Century (1997, revised edition 2014)
Ideal Homes 1918-39: Domestic design and suburban modernism  (Manchester University Press, 2018)

References

Living people
Academics of the University of Portsmouth
Academics of Falmouth University
British women historians
British historians
Year of birth missing (living people)